Forkhead box protein D4 is a protein that in humans is encoded by the FOXD4 gene.

References

Further reading

Forkhead transcription factors